Perry Park is a park in Perry Barr, Birmingham, England, at .

The park houses Alexander Stadium and Perry Reservoir, a small canal feeder reservoir for the Tame Valley Canal, and is bounded by the canal, the M6 motorway, the A34 and local roads.

It is the venue for the end of the Birmingham International Carnival and in 2004, hosted Radio 1's final One Big Weekend under that name, with performers including Chris Moyles, Natasha Bedingfield, Lostprophets, Joss Stone and Mylo.

It is separate from the similarly named Perry Hall Park, also in Perry Barr.

The popular Birmingham BMX Track or Birmingham Bike Park is located just within the park, off the Aldridge Road entrance.

World War II 

During World War II, the park housed a heavy anti-aircraft battery. In 1940 this comprised four 4.5-inch guns and GL Mk. II radar, operated by 346 Battery, 95th Royal Artillery Regiment. In 1945 it had four 3.7-inch Mark VI guns and four 3.7-inch Mark IIIs, operated by 5th Battery, 4th (Mobile) Royal Artillery Regiment.

References

External links
 Birmingham City Council page on the park via archive.org

Parks and open spaces in Birmingham, West Midlands
Perry Barr